Qian Jiaju (1909–2002) was a Chinese economist and a leading figure in the Chinese People’s Political Consultative Conference (CPPCC) and in the China Democratic League.

Life
Born in Wuyi county, Zhejiang province, Qian graduated from the Department of Economics at Peking University in the 1930s. During the Hundred Flowers Campaign (1956-57) he criticised the Chinese Communist Party for interfering politically in science and technology. In 1967, during the Cultural Revolution, he was branded a follower of Liu Shaoqi. After re-appearing in the 1980s, he continued to voice criticism: for example, of the role of the National People’s Congress (NPC), the Three Gorges Dam Project, and the economic austerity measures of Li Peng in 1988-89. In 1989 he moved to the USA, where he took up Buddhism. He later returned to China, and lived in Shenzhen, until his death in 2002.

Numismatics
In addition to his economic and political work, Qian was also interested in numismatics, and co-authored (with Guo Yangang 郭彥岗) 中国货币演变史 (History of the Evolution of Chinese Money). He provided the calligraphy for the front cover of Qianbi Bolan, the quarterly journal of the Shanghai Numismatic Society.

References

1909 births
2002 deaths
Chinese numismatists
Republic of China economists
Politicians from Jinhua
Victims of the Cultural Revolution
National University of Peking alumni
People's Republic of China economists
Writers from Jinhua
People's Republic of China politicians from Zhejiang
Republic of China historians
People's Republic of China historians
Historians from Zhejiang